The Uyghur Cyrillic alphabet (or) is a Cyrillic-derived alphabet used for writing the Uyghur language, primarily by Uyghurs living in Kazakhstan and former CIS countries.

It was devised around 1937 by the Soviet Union, which wanted an alternative to the Latin-derived alphabet they had devised some eleven years earlier, in 1926, as they feared a romanization of the Uyghur language would strengthen the relationship of the Uyghurs to Turkey, which had switched to a Latin-based alphabet in 1927–1928.

After the proclamation of the Communist People's Republic of China in 1949, Russian linguists began helping the Chinese with codifying the various minority languages of China and promoting Cyrillic-derived alphabets and thus the Uyghurs of China also came to use the Uyghur Kiril Yëziqi.

As the tensions between the Soviet Union and China grew stronger, the Chinese dismissed the Uyghur Kiril Yëziqi and as of 1959, the newly devised Uyghur Yëngi Yëziqi became the new alphabet of use among the Chinese Uyghurs and eventually China restored the Arabic script to write Uyghur till now. Uyghur Kiril Yëziqi continued to be used in the Soviet Union, however and is today used in Kazakhstan and former CIS countries and is also the alphabet used for writing Standard Soviet Uyghur.
The letters in the Uyghur Cyrillic Alphabet are, in order:

References

External links
Uyghur Awazi (The largest Uyghur Cyrillic news publication online) 
Xinjiang travel guide (in Uyghur Cyrillic)

Uyghur language
Cyrillic alphabets
Alphabets used by Turkic languages